Nathalie Kubalski (born 3 September 1993) is a German field hockey player for the German national team.

She participated at the 2018 Women's Hockey World Cup.

References

1993 births
Living people
German female field hockey players
Female field hockey goalkeepers
21st-century German women